Hooke is a small village and civil parish in the county of Dorset in southern England, situated about  northeast of the town of Bridport. It is sited in the valley of the short River Hooke, a tributary of the River Frome, amongst the chalk hills of the Dorset Downs. In the 2011 census the parish had a population of 157.

Rampisham Down, the hill immediately northeast of the village, is the site of a transmitter station operated by VT Communications, broadcasting long-range radio signals for clients including BBC World Service. The outskirts of the village are home to Hooke Court and its surrounding parklands. Originally built in 1407 by Humphrey Stafford, the Court was extended in 1609 by the Marquis of Winchester.

To the southwest of the village are Warren Hill and the woods of Hooke Park on its western flanks.

References

External links

Villages in Dorset